Kate Hall-Harnden ( Hall, born January 12, 1997) is an American track and field athlete specializing in the long jump and Sprint. Hall started coaching Track and Field at Saint Joseph's College of Maine in 2018.

Career
Hall  is a Type 1 diabetic, having been diagnosed with the condition age 10.

Kate Hall erased the oldest girls' high school record in track and field when the 2015 high school senior from Maine leaped 22 feet, 5 inches outdoors at New Balance Outdoor Nationals in June 2015. Hall's record-breaking long jump has surpassed the minimum standard for the 2016 Rio Olympics set by the international track federation (IAAF). It also made her the No. 6-ranked American female long jumper in 2015, No. 16 in the world in 2016 and No. 6-ranked American female long jumper - No. 18 in the world in 2017.

In January 2021, Hall-Harnden announced recovering from ACL injury.

NCAA

Kate Hall won long jump in College Station, Texas / Texas A&M University at 2018 NCAA Division I Indoor Track and Field Championships in Long Jump with a jump of  ahead of Georgia Lady Bulldogs teammates (triple jump champion) Keturah Orji and Tara Davis whom placed 2nd and 3rd respectively. Hall also placed 6th in the 60 meters (7.24 s) after running a lifetime best 7.17 seconds (p).

Kate Hall won long jump in Eugene, Oregon / University of Oregon at 2017 NCAA Division I Outdoor Track and Field Championships in Long Jump with a jump of  ahead of Georgia Lady Bulldogs teammate and triple jump champion Keturah Orji.

Hall, who broke the national girls high school record in the long jump less than a year ago, in her first event as a Cyclone at the Big 4 Duals on January 23, 2016, ran the second fastest 60-meter dash time in ISU history (7.40 seconds).

Prep
Hall is a 2015 graduate of Lake Region High School in Naples, Maine.

She had a high school personal best long jump of 22 feet 5 inches. Hall placed third in 100 meters at the 2015 New Balance Nationals Outdoor.

She was named Maine Girls Track & Field Athlete of the Year by USA Today High School Sports in June 2015. The Gatorade State Girls Track & Field Athletes of the Year were selected based on athletic production and impact in the 2014–15 season.

The Gatorade Company, in collaboration with USA TODAY High School Sports, on June 19, 2014, announced selected her as its 2013–14 Gatorade Maine Girls Track & Field Athlete of the Year. She is the first Gatorade Maine Girls Track & Field Athlete of the Year to be chosen from Lake Region High School.

Hall won 2015 Maine State Track and Field Championship Class B State titles in long jump (20' 4.75), 200 meters (24.82), 100 meters (11.69), and placed 4th in 4x100 meters relay with Danica Chadwick, Hannah Chadwick, Sarah Hancock, Kate Hall.

References

External links
 
 
 
 

1997 births
Living people
American female long jumpers
American female sprinters
Track and field athletes from Maine
Georgia Lady Bulldogs track and field athletes
People from Casco, Maine
American track and field coaches
People with type 1 diabetes
USA Indoor Track and Field Championships winners